The 2012–13 Luxembourg National Division was the 99th season of top-tier football in Luxembourg. It began on 5 August 2012 and ended on 25 May 2013. F91 Dudelange were the defending champions having won their tenth league championship in the previous season.

Team changes from 2011–12
US Rumelange and US Hostert were relegated to the Division of Honour after finishing 13th and 14th in the previous season. Both clubs were relegated after one year in the top flight. They were replaced by 2011–12 Division of Honour champions Jeunesse Canach and runners-up Etzella Ettelbruck. Both clubs return to the top flight after a one-year absence.

Hesperange as 12th-placed team had to compete in a single play-off match against third-placed Division of Honour side Wiltz. Wiltz won the match by 6–2, and they returned to the top division after a one-year absence. Swift Hesperange were relegated to the Division of Honour after an eleven-year stay in the top division.

Stadia and locations

League table

Results

Relegation play-offs
The 12th-placed club in the National Division will compete in a relegation play-off match against the third-placed team from the Division of Honour for one spot in the following season's competition. This will take place once both seasons have finished, usually around the middle of May.

Season statistics

Top scorers

See also
2012–13 Luxembourg Cup

External links

Luxembourg National Division seasons
Luxembourg National Division
1